The Department of the Arts, Sport, the Environment and Territories was an Australian government department that existed between December 1991 and March 1993.

History
The department was created on 27 December 1991, a departmental name change by the Keating Government.

Scope
Information about the department's functions and/or government funding allocation could be found in the Administrative Arrangements Orders, the annual Portfolio Budget Statements and in the Department's annual reports.

At its creation, the Department dealt with:
Cultural affairs, including support for the arts 
National collections 
National heritage 
Sport and recreation 
Environment and conservation 
Meteorology 
Information co-ordination and services within Australia, including advertising 
Administration of the Australian Capital Territory 
Administration of the Jervis Bay Territory, the Territory of Cocos (Keeling) Islands, the Territory of Christmas Island, the Coral Sea  Islands Territory, the Territory of Ashmore and Cartier Islands, the Australian Antarctic Territory, and the Territory of Heard  Island and the McDonald Islands, and of Commonwealth responsibilities on Norfolk Island 
Constitutional development of the Northern Territory of Australia.

Structure
The Department was an Australian Public Service department, staffed by officials responsible to the Minister for the Arts, Sport, the Environment and Territories, Ros Kelly.

References

Ministries established in 1991
Defunct environmental agencies
Arts, Sport, the Environment and Territories
1991 establishments in Australia